The T Second Avenue Local is a prospective rapid transit service in the B Division of the New York City Subway. It is proposed to run on the Second Avenue Subway in Manhattan and its route symbol will be . 

The first phase of the Second Avenue Subway opened in January 2017, from 63rd Street to 96th Street, and is served by the  train. The full Second Avenue Line will be built in four phases, and the planned T service will not run until the third phase of the line opens from Houston Street to 63rd Street. Currently, the third phase is not funded or scheduled.

Historical designation

Original service

The T designation was originally used for West End local and express trains in Brooklyn. The elevated BMT West End Line opened in 1916, replacing the original West End surface Line that opened in 1863 and branched off of the former Fifth Avenue Elevated. The BMT West End Line connected to the recently-opened BMT Fourth Avenue Line subway. The new elevated line's service was originally labeled 3 by the Brooklyn-Manhattan Transit Corporation (BMT). On June 24, 1916, 3 service began running between 18th Avenue and Chambers Street on the BMT Nassau Street Line via the Manhattan Bridge and the Nassau Street Loop. This service was extended to 25th Avenue on July 29, 1916 and Coney Island–Stillwell Avenue on December 23, 1918.

On September 4, 1917, the first part of the BMT Broadway Line opened, and 3 service ran to 14th Street–Union Square. Chambers Street service was probably suspended until the remainder of the Nassau Street loop was completed. Service began running to the newly opened Times Square–42nd Street station on January 15, 1918. Service began running part-time to 57th Street–Seventh Avenue on July 10, 1919, and this extension was probably axed in 1920.

The BMT Nassau Street Line and the Nassau Loop were completed on May 31, 1931. Weekday rush hour service and Saturday morning local resumed service from Bay Parkway or 62nd Street to Chambers Street running via the Montague Tunnel, and returning via the Manhattan Bridge south tracks.

The Saturday morning rush hour local service to Chambers Street, on June 24, 1950, was discontinued. All express trains began running to 57th Street on May 2, 1957. On October 24, 1957, late night service was replaced by locals to Chambers Street, running via the tunnel in both directions, and terminating at Coney Island–Stillwell Avenue. Express service was eliminated during middays, being replaced by locals extended to Coney Island on May 28, 1959. At this time all locals to Chambers Street began running via the tunnel in both directions.

|
R10–R38 rollsigns
Letters began appearing in the summer of 1961, when R27 subway cars began running on the line. Express trains were given the label of T, and the locals were given the label of TT, in accordance with the Independent Subway System's old system labeling express trains with single letters and local trains with double letters. On January 1, 1961, rush hour T expresses began running to Astoria–Ditmars Boulevard in along the BMT Astoria Line in Queens, and until April 2, 1962 so did Saturday service. TT local service on January 1 began running between Bay Parkway and Chambers Street. During middays, local service only ran between Coney Island and Chambers Street. After April 2, 1962, T service began running to 57th Street during evenings and Saturdays; on nights and Sundays TT shuttle service ran to 36th Street. On May 2, 1962, T trains ceased stopping at 49th Street.

Post-Chrystie Street Connection

The T was discontinued on November 26, 1967, after the Chrystie Street Connection opened. This connection linked the new express tracks of the IND Sixth Avenue Line to the Manhattan Bridge, allowing for increased subway service between Brooklyn and Midtown Manhattan. As a consequence, the connection between the Nassau Street Line and the Manhattan Bridge was severed, ending the Nassau Street Loop in Lower Manahttan. The BB, a Sixth Avenue Line service which formerly operated solely in Manhattan, was now extended to Brooklyn via the Manhattan Bridge, running along the BMT Fourth Avenue Line and BMT West End Line to Coney Island. This new B service replaced T and TT service into Manhattan. However, late-night and Sunday shuttle service between Coney Island and 36th Street was still labeled TT. The new color scheme for subway routes introduced that day included a blue TT bullet. On July 1, 1968, the TT designation was discontinued entirely with late-night and Sunday shuttle service labeled B instead.

In the 40 or so years after the opening of the Chrystie Street Connection, a series of service changes caused by construction work led to service patterns temporarily mimicking those of the original T and TT services.
  
From April 26, 1986 to December 11, 1988, the northern tracks of the Manhattan Bridge, leading to the Sixth Avenue Line, closed for repairs, akin to the conditions of the subway prior to the opening of the Chrystie Street Connection. During this time, the T's old service pattern was almost exactly recreated, with B service running via Broadway Express from Coney Island to Astoria–Ditmars Boulevard during rush hours, and during middays, evenings and weekends to Queensboro Plaza. The TT's route via the BMT Nassau Street Line was replicated in 1987, when the M was rerouted from the Brighton Line to the West End Line running to Bay Parkway. The M ran on the BMT Nassau Street and West End Lines on weekdays until June 25, 2010. 

The Manhattan Bridge's north side tracks closed for repairs again on July 22, 2001; B service in Brooklyn via the Sixth Avenue Line was replaced by the new  service, running via Broadway express to Astoria-Ditmars Boulevard, essentially recreating the T route once again.

The T bullet appeared on R32 rollsigns as a black letter on a white circle. The T was programmed into R44 and R46 side signs as a West End route, with various Broadway, Sixth Avenue and Nassau Street designations.

Planned Second Avenue Subway service

Designation
During planning for the Second Avenue Subway in the early 2000s, the MTA decided to designate the line's future full-length service with the letter T, in part because:
 The letters O and I are too easily confused with the digits 0 and 1, respectively.
 The letter K was used until the late 1980s to denote services on the IND Eighth Avenue Line, and earlier on the BMT Jamaica Line, and thus is not preferred. 
 The letter V was in use at the time (and until 2010) to denote services on the IND Sixth Avenue Line and IND Queens Boulevard Line.
 H is the Rockaway Park Shuttle's internal route designator.
 The letters P, U and Y are more easily confused with common words.

The Ts route emblem is colored  (hex triplet #00ADD0, which could also be considered robin's egg blue or teal) because the color had also been used for the JFK Express in the past. In 2011, turquoise was considered "the color of the year", and at the time of the color's selection in the 2000s, it was also considered a very upscale color.

Planned service pattern
When the construction of the Second Avenue Subway's Phase 3 is completed, the proposed T service will operate from Harlem–125th Street to Houston Street. After Phase 4 opens, T service will run the full length of the line, from Harlem–125th Street to Hanover Square. The new T service is planned to operate at a frequency of 14 trains per hour during rush hours.

As planned, the T will use the following lines with the same service pattern at all times.

Planned station listing
Should Phase 3 of the Second Avenue Subway be built, the proposed T route would run entirely in Manhattan and would be the only non-shuttle New York City Subway service to run only within one borough.

References

Defunct New York City Subway services